The Crescent is a postmodern office, hotel, and retail complex located at 200 Crescent Court in Uptown Dallas, Texas, United States. The 10-acre complex was designed by Philip Johnson and John Burgee and was completed in 1986.  The structure has  of office space in three office towers, Hotel Crescent Court, and an upscale shopping center including department store Stanley Korshak.

History 

In the early 1980s Dallas developer Caroline Hunt and Rosewood Corp. purchased several blocks of old automobile dealerships north of downtown Dallas with plans to create a grand mixed-use development. Excavation began with one of the largest holes on record, creating a 5-level, 4,100 space underground parking facility. The development was one of the most expensive ever constructed in Dallas with an estimated cost of $400 million. Opening in 1986 with a gala event, the complex initially struggled to attract tenants during a depressed economy.  Its elegant appointments and location in the center of the (then) transitioning Uptown neighborhood attracted multiple financial firms and upscale retailers (moving the center of the financial industry from Main Street to Uptown). The Crescent is sometimes credited for setting the quality level for much of the surrounding neighborhood, and today commands some of the highest office rents in Dallas. In 2014 plans were announced to transform and update the exterior of the building, resulting in more park space along with retail and office upgrades.

Design
Designed by architects Philip Johnson and John Burgee, The Crescent's neo-French classical design was meant to evoke historic architecture of Galveston on a massive scale. The resulting architecture was heavily criticized at the time of completion, but has grown into favor as the neighborhood evolved. The complex comprises several structures:
 An office complex with a contiguous 19-story center tower and two 18-story side towers set in a Crescent-shaped contour. 
 A 5-story central building containing the Hotel Crescent Court separated from the office complex by a central motor court.
 A low-rise, triangular retail and office building
The entire complex is clad in acres of Indiana limestone, eclipsing the Empire State Building for the amount of limestone used during construction. The building lobby areas are finished in ten different types of marble, and covering the complex is the largest cut slate roof in the world (250,000 tiles installed by skilled craftsmen). The exterior is adorned with $6 million worth of ornamental cast aluminum metal used on balconies, trellises and railings.

References

External links
 The Crescent

Buildings and structures completed in 1986
Buildings and structures in Dallas
John Burgee buildings
Skyscraper office buildings in Dallas
Philip Johnson buildings
Skyscraper hotels in Dallas